Broon is sometimes (especially in the northern UK and in Scots) a variant spelling or pronunciation for the color brown
 Broon is also sometimes a slang term for a beer: Newcastle Brown Ale
 A comic strip, The Broons
 Broon may possibly have other meanings, see Brown (disambiguation)
 Broon is the name of an American Renaissance Faire stage show. Broon is portrayed by variety-comedian Brian Howard.